The University of Pittsburgh Medical Center (UPMC) is a $21billion integrated global nonprofit health enterprise that has 89,000 employees, 40 hospitals with more than 8,000 licensed beds, 700 clinical locations including outpatient sites and doctors' offices, a 3.7million-member health insurance division, as well as commercial and international ventures. It is closely affiliated with its academic partner, the University of Pittsburgh.  It is considered a leading American health care provider, as its flagship facilities have ranked in U.S. News & World Report "Honor Roll" of the approximately 15 to 20 best hospitals in America for over 15 years. As of 2016, flagship hospital, UPMC Presbyterian is ranked 12th nationally among the best hospitals (and first in Pennsylvania) by U.S. News & World Report and ranked in 15 of 16 specialty areas when including UPMC Magee- Hospital. This does not include UPMC Children's Hospital of Pittsburgh which ranked in the top 10 of pediatric centers in a separate US News ranking.

References 

University of Pittsburgh
University of Pittsburgh Medical Center